Gente sin historia (English: People Without History) is a Mexican telenovela produced by Televisa for Telesistema Mexicano in 1967.

Cast 
Chucho Salinas
Alma Delia Fuentes
Rafael del Río
Óscar Ortiz de Pinedo

References

External links 

Mexican telenovelas
1967 telenovelas
Televisa telenovelas
Spanish-language telenovelas
1967 Mexican television series debuts
1967 Mexican television series endings